The 541st Aircraft Control and Warning Group (AC&WG) is a disbanded United States Air Force unit. It was last assigned to the 30th Air Division, stationed at Selfridge Air Force Base, Michigan. It was inactivated on 6 February 1952 and disbanded on 21 September 1984.

This command and control organization activated on 5 December 1949, and was responsible for the organization, manning and equipping of new Aircraft Control and Warning (Radar) units.  On 1 May 1950, the reserve 565th AC&WG was activated as a Corollary unit at Selfridge, sharing the 541st's equipment and facilities.  The 565th was called to active duty on 2 June 1951 and was inactivated, with its personnel used as fillers for the 541st.   It was inactivated in 1952 with its units being assigned directly to the 30th AD.

Components

 660th Aircraft Control and Warning Squadron
 Selfridge AFB, Michigan, 5 December 1949-6 February 1952
 661st Aircraft Control and Warning Squadron
 Selfridge AFB, Michigan, 5 December 1949-6 February 1952
 662d Aircraft Control and Warning Squadron
 Brookfield AFS, Ohio, 18 April 1950-6 February 1952
 663d Aircraft Control and Warning Squadron
 Maryville, Tennessee, 27 November 1950-6 February 1952
 664th Aircraft Control and Warning Squadron
 Lockbourne AFB, Ohio, 18 April 1950-6 February 1952
 665th Aircraft Control and Warning Squadron
 Calumet AFS, Ohio, 27 November 1950-6 February 1952
 752d Aircraft Control and Warning Squadron
 Empire AFS, Michigan, 27 November 1950-6 February 1952
 753d Aircraft Control and Warning Squadron
 Sault Sainte Marie AFS, Michigan, 27 November 1950-6 February 1952

 754th Aircraft Control and Warning Squadron
 Port Austin AFS, Michigan, 27 November 1950-6 February 1952
 755th Aircraft Control and Warning Squadron
 Williams Bay AFS, Wisconsin, 27 November 1950-6 February 1952
 781st Aircraft Control and Warning Squadron
 Custer AFS, Michigan, 16 April 1951-6 February 1952
 782d Aircraft Control and Warning Squadron
 Rockville AFS, Indiana, 16 April 1951-6 February 1952
 783d Aircraft Control and Warning Squadron
 Guthrie AFS, West Virginia, 16 April 1951-6 February 1952
 784th Aircraft Control and Warning Squadron
 Godman Field, Kentucky, 16 April 1951-6 February 1952

See also
 List of United States Air Force aircraft control and warning squadrons

References

 
 Grant, C.L., The Development of Continental Air Defense to 1 September 1954, (1961), USAF Historical Study No. 126
 
 

Air control groups of the United States Air Force
Military units and formations established in 1949
Military units and formations disestablished in 1952